Jay Hulme is a transgender performance poet and author from Leicester, in the UK.

Career
In 2015 Hulme won SLAMbassadors UK, the UK's biggest youth poetry slam, run by Joelle Taylor on behalf of The Poetry Society. That year of the slam was judged by Anthony Anaxagorou and held in The Clore Ballroom at The Southbank Centre.

In 2017 he competed in the BBC Edinburgh Fringe Slam and later in the year was featured on the BBC Asian Network's Spoken Word Showcase.

Hulme's poetry features in a number of solo poetry collections, as well as anthologies published by small presses, such as Otter-Barry Books, and larger publishers, such as Bloomsbury and Ladybird Books.

In 2021, Hulme was appointed poet in residence at St Giles in the Fields.

Personal life
Born on 28 January 1997 in Leicester, Jay Hulme was educated at Stonehill High School and Longslade Community College in Birstall, Leicestershire. 

In 2018 he graduated from the University of the West of England with a BA(Hons) in English and Journalism.

He did not believe in God before having a supposed encounter with the divine. He converted to Anglicanism in 2019.

Bibliography
The Prospect of Wings (2015)
A Heartful of Fist (2016, Out-Spoken Press)
City Boys Should Not Feed Horses (2016)
Rising Stars (2017, Otter-Barry Books)
Clouds Cannot Cover Us (2019, Troika Books)
The Book of Queer Prophets: 21 Writers on Sexuality and Religion (2020, Harper Collins)
Here Be Monsters (2021, Pop Up)
The Backwater Sermons (2021, Canterbury Press)
My Own Way (2021, Quarto)

Award nominations
 Carnegie Medal (2021)

References

External links 
 

1997 births
Living people
English male poets
English performance artists
English LGBT poets
English transgender people
People from Leicester
Transgender poets
Transgender men
Alumni of the University of the West of England, Bristol
21st-century English poets
21st-century English male writers
Slam poets
Converts to Anglicanism from atheism or agnosticism
LGBT Anglicans
Anglican poets
English Anglicans
British children's writers